Jennette McCurdy is the self-titled debut studio album by American singer and actress Jennette McCurdy, released on June 5, 2012, by Capitol Records Nashville. McCurdy was 19 years old at the time of the release and co-wrote six of the ten songs on the album. The majority of the album was produced by Paul Worley, who also produced her debut extended play, Not That Far Away (2010), while Jay DeMarcus of Rascal Flatts produced the album's first two tracks. One single was released from the album, "Generation Love", which charted for seven weeks on the Billboard Hot Country Songs chart, peaking at number 44.

Upon its release, the album failed to chart. McCurdy left Capitol Nashville shortly after the release of the album.

Background 
McCurdy developed an interest in country music after her grandmother introduced her to Patsy Cline's music when she was seven years old. At age eight, McCurdy appeared in Faith Hill's music video "The Way You Love Me". In 2007, at age 15, she won the role of Sam Puckett on the Nickelodeon series iCarly. When she was not on set, she would write songs. In an interview, McCurdy said:

Music and lyrics 
Jennette McCurdy consists of 10 tracks. A bonus song "Broken Umbrella" was available exclusively on McCurdy's website as the eleventh track. Paul Worley produced the majority of the album, while Jay DeMarcus produced "Generation Love" and "Don't You Just Hate Those People". Both Worely and DeMarcus produced "Broken Umbrella". Numerous popular country songwriters including Liz Rose, Charles Kelley and Dave Haywood of Lady A, and Eric Paslay have writing credits on the album.

Songs 
The opening track, "Generation Love", is a country pop ballad where the song's female narrator laments on the modern generation, which is seen as selfish and caught up in mainly the technological world. It is contrasted with the early generations of the Great Depression, War veterans and the post-World War II generation that performed feats such as landing on the moon. "Don't You Just Hate Those People" is a fast-paced country song where McCurdy sings in the perspective of someone who is jealous of all the couples around them, hoping they too will fall back in love soon. In the country rock song "Break Your Heart", McCurdy sings in the perspective of a girl who recently had a breakup, who says she will break her former lover's heart on the radio with the song she wrote. "Better" is a stripped-down country song about a recent breakup where McCurdy reminisces their time together by seeing his things in the corner of her room and looking at old pictures.

The fifth track, "Heart of a Child", is a ballad where McCurdy wishes she was an innocent child again, feeling time is slipping away and that she wants to take every chance given in the past. "Love is on the Way" features a prominent banjo where McCurdy assures to not give up and to trust love. The seventh track, "Stronger", is about McCurdy's mother and her battle with cancer. McCurdy reassures that her mother is not alone and that she becomes stronger with each battle. The genre-crossing song "Put Your Arms Around Someone" is an up-beat song about bringing positivity to those who need it most.

With the ninth track, "Place to Fall", McCurdy sings that she feels alone and that she needs a place to let it all out. The final track, "Have to Say Goodbye", draws influence from R&B where McCurdy sings soulfully about falling in love. The bonus track "Broken Umbrella" is told in a perspective of a female who will stay by her partner's side, regardless of the situations they face.

Release and aftermath 
Shortly after the release of the album, McCurdy confirmed that she had left Capitol Nashville, citing conflicts with a new series in which she was cast. In 2022, McCurdy described her music career as "a much-regretted country music blip".

Track listing

Personnel 
Credits adapted from album's liner notes.
Jennette McCurdy – lead vocals, background vocals, songwriting
Paul Worley – production, electric guitar
Jay DeMarcus – production
Chris McHugh – drums
Mark Hill – bass
Ilya Toshinsky – acoustic guitar
Tom Bukovac – electric guitar
Charlie Judge – keyboards
Paul Franklin – steel guitar
Russell Terrell – background vocals
Jonathan Yudkin – fiddle, mandolin, strings
Hillary Lindsey – background vocals
Chad Cromwell – drums
David Huff – drum loop, digital editing
Micheal Rojas – piano, B3, synth, accordion
Alison Prestwood – bass
Rob McNelley – electric guitar
Chris Rodriguez – electric guitar, harmony vocals
Biff Waston – acoustic guitar
Tania Hancheroff – harmony vocals
Wes Hightower – harmony vocals
Bruce Bouton – steel
Kenny Greenberg – electric guitar
Erik Hellerman – assistant engineer
John Naiper – assistant engineer
Adam Ayan – mastering
Andrew Mendelson – mastering
Steve Blackmoon – mixing assistant
Andrew Bazinet – mixing assistant
Sean Neff – digital editing
Daniel Bacigalupi – mastering assistant
Natthaphol Abhigantaphand – mastering assistant
Shelley Anderson – mastering assistant
Paige Conners – production coordination
Justin Niebank – mixing
Drew Bollman – mixing assistant
Mike "Frog" Griffith – production coordination
Jeremy Witt – production assistant
Clarke Schleicher – mixing
Joanna Carter – art director
Michelle Hall – art production
Kristin Barlowe – photography
Bibi Bielat – design

Chart performance

Singles

Release history

External links
All Music Entry

References

2012 debut albums
Jennette McCurdy albums
Capitol Records albums
Albums produced by Paul Worley
Albums produced by Jay DeMarcus
Country albums by American artists